This is a list of episodes for the second season of Lou Grant.

Episodes

Ratings
The show ranked 33rd out of 114 shows airing during the 1978-79 season, with an average 19.6/31 rating/share.

References

1978 American television seasons
1979 American television seasons
Lou Grant (TV series) seasons